was one of 18   escort destroyers built for the Imperial Japanese Navy during World War II. Completed in late 1944, the ship began convoy escort duties in October. She escorted cruisers on a bombardment mission in the Philippines during Operation Rei in December. Kashi was damaged by an American airstrike in Taiwan in early 1945 and returned to Japan for repairs. She spent the rest of the war escorting convoys in Japanese waters and was slightly damaged during the American attacks on Kure and the Inland Sea in July. She was used to repatriate Japanese personnel after the war until 1947. Mid-year the destroyer was turned over to the United States and subsequently scrapped.

Design and description
Designed for ease of production, the Matsu class was smaller, slower and more lightly armed than previous destroyers as the IJN intended them for second-line duties like escorting convoys, releasing the larger ships for missions with the fleet. Their crew numbered 210 officers and enlisted men. The ships had two Kampon geared steam turbines, each driving one propeller shaft using steam provided by two Kampon water-tube boilers.

The main armament of the Matsu-class ships consisted of three  Type 89 dual-purpose guns in one twin-gun mount aft and one single mount forward of the superstructure. The single mount was partially protected against spray by a gun shield. The accuracy of the Type 89 guns was severely reduced against aircraft because no high-angle gunnery director was fitted. The ships carried a total of twenty-five  Type 96 anti-aircraft guns in 4 triple and 13 single mounts. The Matsus were equipped with Type 13 early-warning and Type 22 surface-search radars. The ships were also armed with a single rotating quadruple mount amidships for  torpedoes. They could deliver their 36 depth charges via two stern rails and two throwers.

Construction and career
Authorized in the late 1942 Modified 5th Naval Armaments Supplement Program, Kashi was laid down on 5 May 1944 Fujinagata Shipyards at their Osaka facility and launched on 13 August. Upon her completion on 30 September, the ship was assigned to Destroyer Squadron 11 of the Combined Fleet for training. Kashi escorted a convoy to Singapore during 14 November–4 December. She was assigned to Destroyer Division 52, Destroyer Squadron 11 of the Combined Fleet a day after the escort mission began. The division was transferred to Escort Squadron 31 of the 5th Fleet on the 20th. Kashi steamed from Manila, the Philippines, to Cam Ranh Bay in occupied French Indochina on 15–16 December to participate in Operation Rei, an attack on the American forces at San Jose on the island of Mindoro. Five destroyers, including Kashi, escorted two cruisers that departed on 24 December. They were attacked by American aircraft late the next day; the ship was not a target during the attack and the Japanese ships returned to Cam Ranh Bay.

Kashi arrived in Takao, Taiwan, on 7 January 1945 and was moderately damaged by American aircraft on 21 January. The ship was able to reach Hong Kong two days later and then escorted a convoy from Shanghai to  Moji on 2–7 February. She continued onwards to Sasebo, Japan, where she was docked for permanent repairs. On 5 February Escort Squadron 31 was transferred to the Combined Fleet. The ship arrived at Kure on 14 March and remained in the Seto Inland Sea for the rest of the war. The squadron was reassigned to the Second Fleet from 15 March to 20 April and then rejoined the Combined Fleet. Kashi was lightly damaged during the attacks on Kure and the Inland Sea in July. She was turned over to Allied forces at Kure at the time of the surrender of Japan on 2 September and was stricken from the navy list on 5 October. The destroyer was disarmed and used to repatriate Japanese personnel in 1945–1947. The ship was turned over to the United States on 7 August of the latter year and scrapped by Kasado KB in Kobe, Japan, beginning on 20 March 1948.

Citations

Bibliography

 

 
 

Matsu-class destroyers
Ships built by Fujinagata Shipyards
World War II destroyers of Japan
1944 ships